Sir George Fletcher, 2nd Baronet (1633 – 23 July 1700) was an English politician who sat in the House of Commons at various times between 1661 and 1700.

Fletcher was the only surviving son of Sir Henry Fletcher, 1st Baronet and his wife Catharine Dalston, daughter of Sir George Dalston. In 1645, he succeeded his father as baronet. Fletcher was High Sheriff of Cumberland in 1658 and 1680, and Vice Chamberlain to Queen Catherine of Braganza. He was member of parliament (MP) for Cumberland, representing it from 1661 to 1679 and again from 1681 to 1685. He sat a third time for the constituency from 1689 until his death in 1700.

On 27 February 1654 or 1655, he married firstly Alice Hare, daughter of Hugh Hare, 1st Baron Coleraine at Totteridge, and by her he had a son and three daughters. Fletcher married secondly Lady Mary Johnstone, daughter of James Johnstone, 1st Earl of Hartfell by 1665. He had two sons and two daughters by his second wife. Fletcher died, aged 67 and was succeeded in the baronetcy by his son oldest son Henry. His second son George became a member of parliament for Cumberland and Cockermouth.

References

1633 births
1700 deaths
Baronets in the Baronetage of England
High Sheriffs of Cumberland
English MPs 1661–1679
English MPs 1681
English MPs 1689–1690
English MPs 1690–1695
English MPs 1695–1698
English MPs 1698–1700